Franco Mari (born 23 January 1947) is an Italian actor and comedian. Better known as Rupert Sciamenna, his most well-known character, he is famous for his participation in television programs such as Mai dire... on Italia 1 in many sketches with Marcello Macchia.

In 2015 he took part in the movie Italiano medio.

Filmography
 Mani di fata, (1983)
 Lui è peggio di me, (1985)
 Facciamo paradiso, (1995)
 Cucciolo, (1998)
 Tutti gli uomini del deficiente, (1999)
 Italiano medio (2015)
 Omicidio all'italiana (2017)

TV Series
 Intralci, (2006)
 La Villa di Lato, (2009)
 Drammi Medicali, (2009)
 Mario, (2013-2014)

References

External links

20th-century Italian male actors
1947 births
Living people
21st-century Italian male actors
Mass media people from Cremona
Italian male comedians